Sülm is a municipality in the district of Bitburg-Prüm, in Rhineland-Palatinate, western Germany.

Geography 
Sülm lies in the Southwest Eifel, about 5 km southeast of the county town Bitburg. The area extends to the so-called "Bitburger plateau and covers an area of 705 ha, of which 65% are used for agriculture, with 24% is a relatively small proportion of forest existed.

History 
Sülm and 634 are the places Welschbillig, Newel and Röhl with their churches and related of King Dagobert I (reign: 622-638, Trier-residence: 624 to 625) of the Church of St. Pauli pin Trier offered. At that time, Modoald bishop of Trier. 981 this gift in a deed of the Archbishop mentioned Egbert of Trier (bishop 977-993). Sülm is in that document was first mentioned as "Sulmana".

Attractions 
There are numerous renovated farm houses scattered about the municipality. The old war memorial chapel with a sandstone altar dates from 1631. There are also interesting grave markers from the 16th and 17th centuries in the Sülm Cemetery smau . In contrast to most of the burial sites in the Eifel district, several Sülm grave stones from the late 19th century have been preserved in the cemetery.

Economy and infrastructure 
Sülm is today an agricultural and tourist town. The village is home to several full- and part-time farms and three distilleries. In the services sector, it has a village inn, two private guest houses, a kindergarten and a public library.

About 2 km west of the village runs the Bundesstraße 51, which leads to Bitburg and about 10 km from the Bundesautobahn 60.

Sons and daughters of the place 
 Bernhard Lemling (1904–1961), one of the most notable poets of the Eifel

References

Bitburg-Prüm